Attorney General Beshear may refer to:

Andy Beshear (born 1977), Attorney General of Kentucky, son of Steve Beshear
Steve Beshear (born 1944), Attorney General of Kentucky